The Coluna Prestes, also known as Coluna Miguel Costa-Prestes, in English Prestes Column, was a social rebel movement that broke out in Brazil between 1925 and 1927, with links to the Tenente revolts. The rebellion's ideology was diffuse, but the main issues that caused it were the general dissatisfaction with the oligarchic First Brazilian Republic, the demand for the institution of the secret ballot, and the defense of better public education. The rebels marched some 25,000 km (15,534 mi) through the Brazilian countryside. They did not aim to defeat the forces of the Federal government in battle, but rather to ensure their survival and their ability to continue threatening the government.

Uprising 

On 5 July 1924, on the second anniversary of the "18 of the Copacabana Fort revolt", armed revolt exploded in São Paulo. The Tenentes (English: lieutenants), young army officers that were deeply dissatisfied with the country's political and social landscape, under the command of General Isidoro Dias Lopes, occupied large parts of the city. However, they were soon besieged by increasingly numerous federal troops. After 3 weeks under heavy bombardment the rebels abandoned their positions. Filling a train with men and supplies, they retreated into the countryside eventually reaching and occupying the city of Foz do Iguaçu in the state of Paraná, on frontier with Argentina. There the rebels established a powerful defense line, and waited for their enemies, soon to arrive under command of General Cândido Rondon. In support of the revolutionaries similar uprisings broke out in the states of Amazonas and Sergipe, but they were quickly suppressed. In the state of Rio Grande do Sul, however, events took another turn.

As it happened, 3 months after the retreat of the Tenentes from the city of São Paulo, numerous army units also rebelled in the cities of Alegrete, Cachoeira do Sul, Uruguaiana, São Luíz Gonzaga, Santo Ângelo and São Borja. An energetic response by the state government meant that soon the rebels were in disarray. Only in the region of São Luiz Gonzaga they were able to resist under the leadership of Captain Luís Carlos Prestes of the 1st Frontier Battalion of Santo Ângelo. Under his orders, the remaining rebel forces were reorganized.

In December 1924 fourteen thousand men loyal to the government marched towards São Luíz Gonzaga and started to fortify positions around the rebels. By then, Prestes had made contact with an envoy of General Isidoro, João Franscico, a veteran of the Federalist Revolution known as "Hiena do Cati", who informed him of his promotion to colonel by the revolutionary command, gave him full control of the rebel forces in Rio Grande do Sul and ordered him to march north with his men in order to join forces with the paulistas on the shores of the Paraná river. Breaking the siege on 27 December 1924 and escaping his pursuers, Prestes and his column arrived in April 1925 in the city of Santa Helena.

Meeting in Foz do Iguaçu 

The leaders of the revolution held a meeting in Foz do Iguaçu to discuss their course of action, with General Isidoro manifesting his desire to cease hostilities. The proposal of Miguel Costa and Prestes was victorious: it was decided that the revolutionary action would continue, but a war of movement would be pursued: the column would invade Mato Grosso. The rebel armies were reorganized into the 1st Revolutionary Division numbering 1500 ordinary infantrymen, 800 gaúchos and 700 paulistas.

Exile in Bolivia 

Between February and March 1927, after crossing the Pantanal, part of the column led by Siqueira Campos arrived in Paraguay while the rest entered Bolivia. Upon seeing their precarious conditions, General Dias Lopes' instructed the revolutionaries to go into exile. Miguel Costa went to Paso de los Libres while Prestes and two hundred more men headed for Gaiba. On 5 July 1927, the exiles inaugurated a monument in Gaiba in honor of the dead in the column's campaign.

References

Notes

Citations

External links
 Artigo, sítio da Fundação Getúlio Vargas.
 PRESTES, Anita Leocádia. A Coluna Prestes- Uma Epopeia Brasileira

First Brazilian Republic
Rebellions in Brazil